Wenzu Mintoff is a judge in the Superior Courts of Malta. He was appointed by Prime Minister Joseph Muscat in 2014.

Career

Mintoff became a lawyer in 1984. He has worked in the Maltese mission in New York, and has worked at Malta Development Corporation and Malta Enterprise.

Mintoff represented the Malta Labour Party as an MP from 1987 to 1992. He briefly joined the Democratic Alternative before rejoining the Labour Party of which he was an official.

References 

1959 births
University of Malta alumni
Labour Party (Malta) politicians
Members of the House of Representatives of Malta
20th-century Maltese lawyers
People from Pietà, Malta
Leaders of political parties in Malta
Living people
Democratic Alternative (Malta) politicians
20th-century Maltese politicians
21st-century Maltese politicians
21st-century Maltese judges